Ainthorpe is a village in the civil parish of Danby and the Scarborough 
district of the county of North Yorkshire, England.

Governance

The village lies within the Scarborough and Whitby Parliament constituency; the Esk Valley Electoral District of North Yorkshire County Council; and the Danby Ward of the Scarborough District Borough Council. The village is part of the Danby Parish Group that includes Castleton, Westerdale, Fryup and Houlsyke.

Community

The village hosts the Danby Church of England (VC) school, located on Ainthorpe Lane. Built by William Butterfield in 1860, it is a Grade II listed building. The school is within the Secondary Education catchment area for Eskdale School in Whitby.

There is a 16th-century hotel, the Fox & Hounds Inn, in the village.

References 

Villages in North Yorkshire